Count of Bornos is a hereditary title in the Peerage of Spain accompanied by the dignity of Grandee, granted in 1642 by Philip IV to Diego Ramírez de Haro, captain of arquebusiers and Gentilhombre of Charles II when he was an infant.

Counts of Bornos (1642)

 Diego Ramírez de Haro y Gaitán de Ayala, 1st Count of Bornos
 Francisco Ramírez de Haro y Gaitán de Ayala, 2nd Count of Bornos
 Antonio Ramírez de Haro y Otazo de Guevara, 3rd Count of Bornos
 Ángela Ramírez de Haro y Otazo de Guevara, 4th Countess of Bornos
 Inés Ramírez de Haro y Losada, 5th Countess of Bornos
 Ignacio Ramírez de Haro y Lasso de la Vega, 6th Count of Bornos
 Onofre Ramírez de Haro y Lasso de la Vega, 7th Count of Bornos
 Joaquín Ramírez de Haro y Adsor, 8th Count of Bornos
 Antonio Ramírez de Haro y Ramírez de Arellano, 9th Count of Bornos
 José Ramírez de Haro y Ramírez de Arellano, 10th Count of Bornos
 Manuel Ramírez de Haro y Bellvís de Moncada, 11th Count of Bornos
 María Asunción Ramírez de Haro y Crespí de Valldaura, 12th Count of Bornos
 Fernando María Ramírez de Haro y Patiño, 13th Count of Bornos
 Fernando Ramírez de Haro y Álvarez de Toledo, 14th Count of Bornos
 Ignacio Ramírez de Haro y Pérez de Guzmán, 15th Count of Bornos
 Fernando Ramírez de Haro y Valdés, 16th Count of Bornos

See also
List of current Grandees of Spain

References

Bibliography
 

Grandees of Spain
Counts of Spain
Lists of Spanish nobility
Noble titles created in 1642